The Men's 1500 metres event  at the 2007 European Athletics Indoor Championships was held on March 2–3.

Medalists

Results

Heats
First 3 of each heat (Q) and the next 3 fastest (q) qualified for the final.

Final

References
Results

1500 metres at the European Athletics Indoor Championships
1500
2007 in women's athletics